Nasrabad (also Romanized as Naşrābād) is a village in Abravan Rural District, Razaviyeh District, Mashhad County, Razavi Khorasan Province, Iran. At the 2006 census, its population was 546, in 135 families.

References 

Populated places in Mashhad County